Lukarce is a village in the municipality of Bujanovac, Serbia. According to the 2002 census, the town had a population of 31.

References

Populated places in Pčinja District